Hot Tracks is a compilation album by the Scottish hard rock band Nazareth, released in 1976.  The album covers from 1973's Razamanaz album to 1976's Play 'n' the Game. The album also features a slightly longer version of "This Flight Tonight" and the single version of "I Want to Do Everything for You". An EP featuring tracks from the album reached Number 15 in the UK singles chart in the following year.

Track listing

Personnel
Dan McCafferty - vocals
Darrell Sweet - drums
Manny Charlton - guitar, producer
Pete Agnew - bass guitar, guitar

Chart performance

References

External links
Lyrics to songs from Hot Tracks

Nazareth (band) albums
1976 compilation albums
A&M Records compilation albums